David Scott Cumming (6 May 1910 – 18 April 1993) was a Scottish footballer, who played as a goalkeeper for Aberdeen, Arbroath and Middlesbrough. Cumming represented Scotland once, in a 1–0 victory against England at Wembley in 1938.

Middlesbrough signed Cumming from Scottish club Arbroath for £3,000 in 1936. His career was interrupted by the Second World War, but he returned to play for Middlesbrough during the 1946–47 season. During that season he was sent off in a game against Arsenal for punching Leslie Compton. Cumming was forced to retire at the end of the 1946–47 season after operations failed to cure a knee injury.

References

External links

1910 births
1993 deaths
Footballers from Aberdeen
Scottish footballers
Association football goalkeepers
Aberdeen F.C. players
Arbroath F.C. players
Middlesbrough F.C. players
Scottish Football League players
English Football League players
Scotland international footballers
Scotland wartime international footballers
Newcastle United F.C. wartime guest players